Bríd Rodgers (born 20 February 1935) in Gweedore, County Donegal, Ireland, is an Irish nationalist former politician.

Although born and brought up in a Gaeltacht area in the west of County Donegal in the Republic of Ireland, she was politically active in Northern Ireland, where she was Deputy-Leader of the Social Democratic and Labour Party (SDLP) and Member of the Legislative Assembly for Upper Bann.

Political career
Rodgers was educated in Monaghan and University College, Dublin, and has lived in Northern Ireland since 1960. She was involved in the Northern Ireland Civil Rights Association from 1965. She was a founder member of the SDLP, becoming Chairman in 1978 and General Secretary in 1981. In 1983 she was nominated to Seanad Éireann by Taoiseach Garret FitzGerald, and served until 1987.

Rodgers was the leader of the SDLP team in the talks that led to the Good Friday Agreement. She was elected to the Northern Ireland Assembly for the constituency of Upper Bann in June 1998. She was appointed to the first Northern Ireland Executive in November 1999 as Minister of Agriculture and Rural Development, and remained in that position until the suspension of the Executive in October 2002. She became deputy leader of the SDLP in November 2001. She stood down as MLA at the Assembly elections of November 2003, and as deputy leader in February 2004, when she was replaced by Alasdair McDonnell.

Personal life
Rodgers was married to Antoin Rodgers until his death in 2021. They had six children. She is a distant relative of Irish American mobster Vincent Coll. She speaks fluent Irish, French and Italian.

References

1935 births
Living people
People from Gweedore
Alumni of University College Dublin
Members of the 17th Seanad
20th-century women members of Seanad Éireann
Members of the Northern Ireland Forum
Northern Ireland MLAs 1998–2003
Ministers of the Northern Ireland Executive (since 1999)
Social Democratic and Labour Party MLAs
Female members of the Northern Ireland Assembly
Women ministers of the Northern Ireland Executive
Nominated members of Seanad Éireann
Independent members of Seanad Éireann
20th-century women politicians from Northern Ireland
21st-century women politicians from Northern Ireland